Hassan Brijany (12 April 1961 – 23 July 2020) was an Iranian-Swedish actor.

Biography
Brijany grew up in north Iran. His father wanted him to become a brain surgeon, but he was more interested in theater. He got his education in acting in Tehran, but was forced to leave the country in the mid 1980s because of the effects of the Iranian revolution and war with Iraq and travelled to Sweden.

Brijany learned to speak Swedish quickly and already after a few months in the country he got a job as an interpreter for migration work. At the end of the 1980s, Brijany started acting again and debuted in the Play Främmande at Angeredteatern in Gothenburg. He would also appear in TV-series like Tre Kronor on TV4, Tusenbröder and Orka! Orka!
Brijany became known to a larger audience with his role as Serbandi in the film Hus i helve in 2002. He has also had roles in Beck – Det tysta skriket in 2007 and Babas bilar in 2006.

Hassan Brijany died in July 2020, after suffering from COVID-19 during the COVID-19 pandemic in Sweden.

Filmography
2002 – Vera med flera
2002– Hus i helvete
2003 – Paragraf 9 (TV-series)
2004 – Tusenbröder II
2005 – Orka! Orka!
2006 – Exit
2006 – Babas Bilar
2006 – Mäklarna
2006 – Möbelhandlarens dotter
2006 – LasseMajas detektivbyrå
2007 – Labyrint
2007 – Beck – Det tysta skriket
2007 – Råttatouille (voice as Mustafa)
2007 – Ett öga rött
2007– 2009 – Hjälp!
2008 – LasseMajas detektivbyrå - Kameleontens hämnd
2008 – George 
2010 – Saltön
2012 – Kontoret
2014 – LasseMajas detektivbyrå – Stella Nostra
2017 - Sveriges bästa svensk
2020 - Sveriges bästa svensk, part 2

References

External links

1961 births
2020 deaths
Swedish male actors
Iranian emigrants to Sweden
Deaths from the COVID-19 pandemic in Sweden